Glenavy railway station served Glenavy in County Antrim, Northern Ireland. The station is currently closed to passengers.

The station was built for the Dublin and Antrim Junction Railway and opened on 13 November 1871. Translink withdrew passenger services from the line when it reopened the more direct  –  route via . Translink stated that it was unable to maintain two routes to Antrim and after operating a skeleton service on the route announced that it would be mothballed.

References

Disused railway stations in County Antrim
Railway stations opened in 1871
Railway stations closed in 2003
1871 establishments in Ireland
2003 disestablishments in Northern Ireland
Railway stations in Northern Ireland opened in the 19th century